Dinapsoline is a drug developed for the treatment of Parkinson's disease, that acts as a selective full agonist at the dopamine D1 receptor.

References 

D1-receptor agonists
Catechols
Tetrahydroisoquinolines